Geneviève Gauthier (born 1967) is a Canadian mathematician, statistician, and decision scientist, known for her work in mathematical finance including the valuation of options and financial risk management. She is a professor of statistics in the Department of Decision Sciences at HEC Montréal.

Education and career
Gauthier is originally from Montreal, and earned bachelor's and master's degrees in mathematics from the Université du Québec à Montréal in 1989 and 1991. One of her faculty mentors there was Alain Latour. She completed her Ph.D. in mathematics from Carleton University in 1996, under the supervision of Donald A. Dawson; her dissertation was Multilevel Bilinear System of Stochastic Differential Equations.

She became a faculty member at HEC Montréal on completing her doctorate in 1996, and was promoted to full professor there in 2008. She chaired the Department of Decision Sciences from 2013 to 2016.

Recognition
In 2018 the Statistical Society of Canada selected Gauthier as the winner of the SSC Award for Impact of Applied and Collaborative Work, "for her outstanding contributions to the promotion of innovative statistical methodologies in financial engineering, and in the training of highly qualified personnel".

References

External links
Home page

1967 births
Living people
Canadian mathematicians
Canadian women mathematicians
Canadian statisticians
Women statisticians
Université du Québec à Montréal alumni
Carleton University alumni
Academic staff of HEC Montréal